Pararheinheimera mesophila is a Gram-negative bacterium from the genus of Pararheinheimera which has been isolated from sandy soil which was contaminated with pesticide from Eloor in India.

References 

Chromatiales
Bacteria described in 2015